The Basilica of Neptune (Latin: basilica Neptuni) was a basilica built in Rome by Marcus Vipsanius Agrippa in honour of Neptune and in celebration of his naval victories at Mylae, Naulochus and Actium.

History
Near the site of the Pantheon, its remains were restored under Hadrian for an unknown use. The Temple of Hadrian was once misidentified with the basilica.

It was part of building works on the Campus Martius between 33 and 25 BC, possibly financed by the proceeds of Octavian's campaign in Illyria between 35 and 33 BC. The project also included the Pantheon, the Saepta Iulia and the Baths of Agrippa.

References

Bibliography
Lawrence Richardson Jr., s.v. "Basilica Neptuni", in A New Topographical Dictionary of Ancient Rome, Baltimore, JHU, 1992. , p. 54.

External links

Neptune
1st-century BC establishments
Campus Martius
Augustan building projects